Harley Rustad is a Canadian journalist, magazine editor, and author of Lost in the Valley of Death: A Story of Obsession and Danger in the Himalayas and Big Lonely Doug: The Story of One of Canada’s Last Great Trees.

Early life 
Rustad was born on Salt Spring Island, British Columbia, Canada, where he spent the first few months of his life in a tent while his parents built their home. He lives in Toronto, Ontario.

Journalism career 
Rustad has been an editor and writer at The Walrus, a Canadian general interest magazine, since 2014. His writing has appeared in publications including Outside, The Walrus, The Globe and Mail, Geographical, The Guardian, and CNN. He is a faculty editor at the Banff Centre for Arts and Creativity’s Mountain and Wilderness Writing Residency.

Big Lonely Doug 
His first book, Big Lonely Doug: The Story of One of Canada’s Last Great Trees, a nonfiction book published in 2018 is about the second-largest Douglas fir in Canada that was a saved by a logger who wrapped green LEAVE TREE ribbon around its trunk, and the fight to protect old-growth forests in British Columbia. The tree, Big Lonely Doug, is growing in the middle of a clear cut near Port Renfrew, British Columbia. The book started as a magazine article in The Walrus. The book was nominated for the 2018 Shaughnessy Cohen Prize for Political Writing, the 2019 Roderick Haig-Brown Regional Prize, and the 2018 Banff Mountain Book Competition.

Lost in the Valley of Death 
His second book, Lost in the Valley of Death: A Story of Obsession and Danger in the Himalayas, was published in 2022 and investigates the 2016 disappearance of Justin Alexander Shetler in the Parvati Valley, India. It was nominated for a 2022 Banff Mountain Book Award, was a Canadian bestseller, and appeared on the cover of the February 13, 2022, New York Times Book Review.

Awards and honors 
 2022 Banff Mountain Book Award (finalist) for Lost in the Valley of Death
 2018 Globe and Mail Best Books of the Year for Big Lonely Doug
 2018 CBC Best Canadian Non-fiction Books of the Year for Big Lonely Doug
 2018 Shaughnessy Cohen Prize for Political Writing (finalist) for Big Lonely Doug
 2018 Banff Mountain Book Award (finalist) for Big Lonely Doug
 2019 Roderick Haig-Brown Regional Prize (finalist) for Big Lonely Doug
 2016 National Magazine Award (silver) "Big Lonely Doug" published in The Walrus.
 2015 National Magazine Award (honourable mention) for "Where the Streets Have No Names" published in The Walrus

Bibliography 

 Big Lonely Doug: The Story of One of Canada’s Last Great Trees. House of Anansi Press. 2018. ISBN 978-1487003111
 Lost in the Valley of Death: A Story of Obsession and Danger in the Himalayas. Harper. 2022. ISBN 978-0062965967

References 

Canadian magazine journalists
Canadian male non-fiction writers
Canadian nature writers
Writers from British Columbia
Living people
21st-century Canadian journalists
21st-century Canadian non-fiction writers
21st-century Canadian writers
1985 births